The 1957 Sydney to Hobart Yacht Race, was the 13th annual running of the "blue water classic" Sydney to Hobart Yacht Race.

Hosted by the Cruising Yacht Club of Australia based in Sydney, New South Wales, the 1957 edition began on Sydney Harbour, at noon on Boxing Day (26 December), before heading south for 630 nautical miles (1,170 km) through the Tasman Sea, past Bass Strait, into Storm Bay and up the River Derwent, to cross the finish line in Hobart, Tasmania.

The 1957 Sydney to Hobart Yacht Race comprised a fleet of 20 competitors, a decrease of 8 yachts from the number in the 1956 race. Line-honours were awarded to Kurrewa IV, which raced out of New South Wales and was owned and skippered by brother's J. & F. Livingston.

1957 fleet
20 yachts registered to begin the 1956 Sydney to Hobart Yacht race. They are:

Results

References

See also
Sydney to Hobart Yacht Race

1957
1957 in sailing
1957 in Australian sport
December 1957 sports events in Australia
January 1958 sports events in Australia